Hewitt's Chalk Bank is a   nature reserve north-east of Pratt's Bottom in the London Borough of Bromley. It is managed by the Kent Wildlife Trust.

This former refuse tip has a large mound which is the soil from the excavation of a railway tunnel. Habitats are grassland and scrub, and unusual flora include grass vetchling and dark mullein.

There is access by a track on the north side of the A21 opposite Sevenoaks Road, but the gate to the site is padlocked.

References

Kent Wildlife Trust